Květoslav Svoboda (born August 25, 1982 in Znojmo) is an Olympic freestyle swimmer from the Czech Republic. He swam for the Czech Republic at the 2000, 2004 and 2008 Olympics.

At the 2002 FINA Short Course World Championships he won the silver medal in the 400m Freestyle behind Australia's Grant Hackett.

References

1982 births
Living people
Olympic swimmers of the Czech Republic
Czech male freestyle swimmers
Swimmers at the 2000 Summer Olympics
Swimmers at the 2004 Summer Olympics
Swimmers at the 2008 Summer Olympics
Medalists at the FINA World Swimming Championships (25 m)
People from Znojmo
Sportspeople from the South Moravian Region